The 1996–97 Detroit Red Wings season was the 71st National Hockey League season in Detroit, Michigan. The highlight of the Red Wings season was winning the Stanley Cup, their first since 1955.

Off-season
On July 23, 1996, Detroit Red Wings President Bill Evo resigned his position after serving just ten months at the team's helm. The Nickname "Hockeytown" was coined to launch the start of a five-year marketing campaign.

Regular season
The "HOCKEYTOWN" logo, a Red Wings logo overlapped with the term "HOCKEYTOWN," was shown over center ice starting this season and was still there .

A season highlight was Sergei Fedorov's five-goal performance on December 26, 1996, in a game against the Washington Capitals. The Red Wings won 5–4 in overtime. Fedorov's fifth goal of the game came at 2:39 of the overtime period.

On February 8, 1997, coach Scotty Bowman achieved his 1000th victory as an NHL head coach against his previous team, the Pittsburgh Penguins.

On March 26, 1997, the Red Wings–Avalanche brawl continued to fuel the rivalry between the teams. Detroit won that game 6–5 in overtime.

Season standings

Schedule and results

Regular season

Playoffs

Playoffs

The Red Wings won the 1997 Stanley Cup Finals, their first Stanley Cup since the 1954–55 NHL season.

Six days after winning the Stanley Cup, tragedy struck when defenseman Vladimir Konstantinov, defenseman Viacheslav Fetisov, and massage therapist Sergei Mnatsakanov were involved in a limousine accident. The driver, who later said he fell asleep, had a suspended license for previous drunk driving convictions.

Player statistics
All statistics were compiled while playing for the Red Wings.

Skaters

Goaltending

† Denotes player spent time with another team before joining the Red Wings. Stats reflect time with the Red Wings only.
‡ Denotes player was traded mid-season. Stats reflect time with the Red Wings only.

Note: GP = Games played; G = Goals; A = Assists; Pts = Points; +/- = Plus/minus; PIM = Penalty minutes;       GS = Games started; TOI = Time on ice; W = Wins; L = Losses; T = Ties; GA = Goals against; GAA = Goals-against average;  SO = Shutouts; SA = Shots against; SV% = Save percentage;

Awards and records

Transactions

Trades

Free agents

Signings

Waivers

Retirement

Draft picks
Detroit's picks at the 1996 NHL Entry Draft.

Notes
 The Red Wings acquired this pick as the result of a trade on April 4, 1995 that sent Mike Sillinger and Jason York to Anaheim in exchange for Stu Grimson, Mark Ferner and this pick.
 The Red Wings third-round pick went to the Boston Bruins as the result of a trade on August 17, 1995 that sent David Shaw to Tampa Bay in exchange for this pick (80th overall).
Tampa Bay previously acquired this pick as the result of a trade on August 17, 1995 that sent Marc Bergevin and Ben Hankinson to Detroit in exchange for Shawn Burr and this pick.

References
 Red Wings on Hockey Database

Stanley Cup championship seasons
D
D
Detroit Red Wings seasons
Western Conference (NHL) championship seasons
Detroit Red Wings
Detroit Red Wings
1997 Stanley Cup